Lake Maggiore (literally 'Greater Lake') or Verbano is a large lake located on the south side of the Alps. It is the second largest lake in Italy and the largest in southern Switzerland. The lake and its shoreline are divided between the Italian regions of Piedmont and Lombardy and the Swiss canton of Ticino.

The climate is mild in both summer and winter, producing Mediterranean vegetation, with many gardens growing rare and exotic plants. Well-known gardens include those of the Borromean and Brissago Islands, that of the Villa Taranto in Verbania, and the Alpinia Botanical Garden above Stresa.

Lake Maggiore is drained by the Ticino river, a main tributary of the Po. Its basin also collects the waters of several large lakes, notably Lake Lugano (through the Tresa), Lake Orta (through the Toce) and Lake Varese (through the Bardello).

Geography
It is the longest Italian lake, although Lake Garda has a greater area. Its mean height above the sea level is 193 metres; a deep lake, its bottom is almost everywhere below sea-level: at its deepest, 179 metres below. Its form is very sinuous so that there are few points from which any considerable part of its surface can be seen at a single glance. If this lessens the effect of the apparent size, it increases the variety of its scenery. While the upper end is completely alpine in character, the middle region lies between hills of gentler form, and the lower end advances to the verge of the plain of Lombardy. Lake Maggiore is the most westerly of the three great southern prealpine lakes, the others being Lake Como and Lake Garda.

Its main tributaries are the Ticino, the Maggia (forming a very large delta), the Toce (by which it receives the outflow of Lake Orta) and the Tresa (which is the sole emissary of Lake Lugano). The rivers Verzasca, Giona, and Cannobino also flow into the lake. Its outlet is the Ticino which, in turn, joins the river Po just south-east of Pavia.

The lake's jagged banks are surrounded by the Pennine and Lepontine Alps, and Lugano Prealps. Prominent peaks around the lake are the Gridone, Monte Tamaro, Monte Nudo and the Mottarone. The western bank is in Piedmont (provinces of Novara and Province of Verbano-Cusio-Ossola) and the eastern in Lombardy (province of Varese), whereas the most northerly section extends  into the canton of Ticino, where it constitutes its lowest point above sea level as well as that of Switzerland.

Climate

Lake Maggiore weather is humid subtropical (Cfa in the Köppen climate classification). During winter, the lake helps to maintain a higher temperature in the surrounding region (since water releases heat energy more slowly than air). The temperatures are cooled down in summer by the breezes that blow on the water's surface, changing its colour. In winter snowfall is erratic and primarily affects the higher elevations. Rainfall is heaviest in May and lowest during the winter months.

Flora and fauna 
The flora is strongly influenced by the lake basin, which has allowed the proliferation of typically Mediterranean plants, and also of plants native to the Atlantic areas favoured by the composition of the soil and the abundance of siliceous rocks. Lemons, olive trees and bay olive trees grow there. The spontaneous vegetation is composed of yew, holly and chestnut trees on the surrounding hills.

In the lake two species of whitefish live, Coregonus and, less widespread, Coregonus lavaretus. Both live in deep water and come ashore only during the spawning in early December. There are also perch, pike, chub, burbot, torpedo, eels and Alburnus arborella. The lake is home to several species of nesting waterfowl, it also represents an important corridor, a place of rest and feeding for migrations. For example: common merganser, royal swan, grebes, gulls, cormorants, ducks.

A number of exotic species have established themselves in the lake, including pikeperch, which has been recorded since 1977; wels catfish, which was first noticed in the early 1990s; and ruffe, introduced in the mid 1990s. Wels catfish in excess of 50 kg in weight have been fished from the lake.

Towns and villages on the lake

Islands

Borromean Islands (three islands and two islets located between Verbania to the north and Stresa to the south)
Isola Bella
Isola Madre
Isola dei Pescatori (or Isola Superiore)
Isolino di San Giovanni (in front of Verbania)
Scoglio della Malghera (between Isola Bella and Isola Pescatori)
Brissago Islands (close to Brissago)
 San Pancrazio (or Grande Isola)
 Isolino (or Isola Piccola or Isola di Sant’Apollinare)
Castelli di Cannero (three small islands just off the shore from Cannero Riviera)
Isolino Partegora (in the gulf of Angera)

Sacro Monte di Ghiffa

The Sacred Mountain of Ghiffa is a Roman Catholic devotional complex in the comune of Ghiffa, (Piedmont, northern Italy), overlooking the Lake Maggiore. It is one of the nine Sacri Monti of Piedmont and Lombardy, included in UNESCO World Heritage list.

Events
The Spirit of Woodstock Festival is an annual open air festival at the end of July/beginning of August. It is organized in Armeno by the Mirapuri community.

History

The first archaeological findings around the lake belong to nomadic people living in the area in prehistoric types. The first settlements discovered date from the Copper Age. The area was later under the control of the Ligures, later replaced by the Celts. The latter was in turn conquered by the Romans, who called the lake Verbanus Lacus or Lacus Maximus.

After the fall of the Western Roman Empire, the lake was under different domains. Most of the current settlements originated in the Middle Ages when the lake was under the Della Torre, Visconti, the Borromeo and Habsburg families.

Methane was first discovered and isolated by Alessandro Volta as he analysed marsh gas from Lake Maggiore, between 1776 and 1778.

In 1936, a Bugatti Type 22 Brescia Roadster, built 1925, was sunk in the lake by employees of Zürich architect Marco Schmucklerski, when Swiss customs officials investigated whether he had paid taxes on the car. The Bugatti was attached to an iron chain making it possible to recover it once the investigation was over, yet that never happened. When the chain corroded, the car sunk to the lake bed, where it was rediscovered on 18 August 1967 by local diver Ugo Pillon and became a favourite target for divers thereafter. When one of the divers, Damiano Tamagni, was killed in a hold-up on 1 February 2008, his friends from the Ascona divers' club decided to lift and sell the car wreck to raise funds for a yet to be created foundation named after the victim. The remains of the Bugatti were recovered on 12 July 2009. The sale took place at the Retro Mobile classic car exhibition in Paris on 23 January 2010. It was sold for €260,500.

In May 2021, a cable car collapsed near the lake, killing 14 people.

The Hotel Meina incident at Lake Maggiore
This incident is part of the Lake Maggiore massacres during WWII.
 
Meina is a municipality located 77 kilometres (48 miles) northwest of Milan, on the southern shores of Lake Maggiore. The Hotel Meina was located north of the town of Meina and was owned by Alberto and Eugenia Behar, Sephardic Jews who had moved to Italy from Constantinople. In September 1943, an armistice was declared between Italy and the Allies. At that time, the Hotel Meina housed a number of Jewish guests, most of them escapees of the Nazi occupation of Greece. The area around Lake Maggiore was not under Allied control but was occupied by the German Waffen-SS, specifically the infamous Leibstandarte SS Adolf Hitler. Captain Hans Krüger, who directed operations in Meina and the surrounding villages, was in charge of locating the Jews in that area and was responsible for the Lake Maggiore massacres in which approximately 54 Jews were murdered.

On the night of 22 September 1943, most of the Jewish residents of the Hotel Meina were executed and their bodies were thrown into Lake Maggiore. The Fernandez-Diaz family, a family of Greek Sephardic Jews from Thessaloniki, barricaded themselves in one of the fourth-floor hotel rooms. It took an extra day for the Germans to reach and execute them. The family included three young children whose lives were not spared despite pleas from older family members. Among those killed were Dino Fernandez-Diaz (76 years old), Pierre Fernandez-Diaz (46), Liliane (Scialom) Fernandez-Diaz (36), Jean Fernandez-Diaz (17), Robert Fernandez-Diaz (13), Blanchette Fernandez-Diaz (12), Marco Mosseri (55), Ester Botton (52), Giacomo Renato Mosseri (22), Odette Uziel (19), Raoul Torres (48), Valerie Nahoum Torres (49), and Daniele Modiano (51). In total, sixteen Jewish residents of the hotel were executed. Its owners, the Behar family, survived due to the efforts of the Turkish consulate.

The Italian police report on the Meina massacre was lost but resurfaced in 1994, along with hundreds of other files of war crimes committed post-armistice by Germans who still occupied or were retreating from Italian soil. These files had been hidden in a wooden cabinet, the so-called "cabinet of shame", discovered in a storeroom of the military prosecutor's headquarters.

Germany does not extradite its citizens convicted of war crimes in other countries. Those responsible for the Meina massacre were tried at home in Germany in 1968, convicted and sentenced to life in prison. However, in 1970, the German Supreme Court declared the statute of limitations for those particular war crimes to have expired, and the prisoners were released.

References in literature and popular culture
Lake Maggiore is featured in American writer Ernest Hemingway's novel A Farewell to Arms. The protagonist (Frederic Henry) and his lover (Catherine Barkley) are forced to cross the transnational border within the lake in a row boat to escape Italian carabinieri.

It also appeared as the location of a fictional racetrack in the racing game Gran Turismo Sport and Gran Turismo 7.

Die Flippers, a German Schlager group wrote a song called "Lago Maggiore" that appears on their 1990 album Sieben Tage Sonnenschein.

Sources

External links

 
CIPAIS Commissione Internazionale per la Protezione delle Acque Italo-Svizzere  limnologic reports on the Lake Maggiore and Lake Lugano
Official website of Ascona-Locarno Tourism

 
International lakes of Europe
Italy–Switzerland border
Lakes of Lombardy
Lakes of Piedmont
Lakes of the Swiss Alps
Lakes of Ticino
Lepontine Alps
Province of Novara
Province of Varese
Province of Verbano-Cusio-Ossola
Subalpine lakes of Italy
Waterways of Italy